Marked Money is a 1928 American silent action film directed by Spencer Gordon Bennet and starring Tom Keene, Tom Kennedy and Virginia Bradford.

The film's sets were designed by the art director Edward C. Jewell.

Cast
 Frank Coghlan Jr. as Boy 
 Tom Keene as Clyde 
 Tom Kennedy as Bill Clemons 
 Bert Woodruff as Capt. Fairchild 
 Virginia Bradford as Grace Fairchild 
 Maurice Black as Donovan 
 Jack Richardson as Scudder 
 Mark Hamilton as Mariner Bill

References

Bibliography
 Munden, Kenneth White. The American Film Institute Catalog of Motion Pictures Produced in the United States, Part 1. University of California Press, 1997.

External links
 

1928 films
1920s action films
1920s English-language films
American silent feature films
American action films
Films directed by Spencer Gordon Bennet
American black-and-white films
Pathé Exchange films
1920s American films